John Lindberg may refer to:

 JLT (John Lindberg Trio)
 John Lindberg (jazz musician) (born 1959), American jazz musician
 John Lindberg (singer) (born 1987), Swedish rockabilly singer
 John G. Lindberg (1884–1973), Finnish ophthalmologist